Martin Alexander Christiansen (April 23, 1916 – March 29, 1999) was an American football fullback. A native of Minneapolis, he played college football for Minnesota from 1937 to 1939. He then played professional football in the National Football League (NFL) for the Chicago Cardinals during the 1940 season. After retiring from football, he worked as a Minneapolis police officer and owner of a gas station. He died in 1999 in Minneapolis.

References

1916 births
1999 deaths
Chicago Cardinals players
Minnesota Golden Gophers football players
Players of American football from Minnesota